These are the international rankings of Nepal

Education

 Literacy rate 70.7% overall

Economy

 2016 Index of Economic Freedom  ranked 152 out of 178
 Ease of Doing Business Index 2020  ranked 94 out of 190
 Global Competitiveness Index 2016-2017  ranked 98 out of 138
 IMF Nominal GDP per capita 2019, ranked 158 out of 187 economies

Politics

 Fragile States Index 2020, ranked 49th most fragile state
 Corruption Perceptions Index 2019, ranked 113rd most corrupt  out of 176 governments
 Press Freedom Index  2017, ranked  100 out of 180 countries  
 Freedom of the Press 2017, ranked 108 out of 198
 Democracy Index 2016, ranked 102 out of 167 governments

Tourism

World Tourism Organization: World Tourism rankings  
World Economic Forum: Travel and Tourism Competitiveness Report

References

Nepal
Economy of Nepal
Politics of Nepal